Events from the year 1778 in Russia.

Incumbents
 Monarch – Catherine II

Events

 
 
  
  
 
 
 
 Kherson
 Mariupol

Births

Deaths

References

1778 in Russia
Years of the 18th century in the Russian Empire